Joseph Edwards (born September 13, 1977), professionally known as Jojo Pellegrino, is an American rapper, songwriter and actor from Staten Island, NY. Known for his lyrical abilities and versatility, Pellegrino was formally managed by Chris Lighty  as a member of the legendary Violator imprint. Pellegrino made his name in the New York Hip hop scene with his debut singles “Fogedaboudid” and “Where I'm from”, "Fogedaboudid" becoming popular on local radio stations.

Early life 
Joseph Edwards (JoJo Pellegrino) was raised in a loving household, in Staten Island New York, by both parents along with his younger sister Jennifer. Throughout most of his childhood and teenage years, Edwards studied various styles of martial arts and also played baseball and basketball. He began writing and recording at the age of 15 years old and through his father's relationship with a colleague, who was managing a few artists at the time, Edwards formed a close bond with local hip-hop sensation Shyheim The Rugged Child, spending most of his time working on his craft in the Stapleton Projects located on the North Shore of Staten Island. He attended New Dorp High School, but during freshman year was removed from the school for fighting, and transferred  to Tottenville High School where he graduated in 1995.

Career 
Pellegrino began his professional career in the music business in 1998 on the mix tape circuit with DJ's such as Dj Clue, DJ Kay Slay, DJ Skribble and many more. He was soon noticed and recruited by Chris Lighty into the Violator management team where he appeared on the Violator V2.0 compilation album  (the second and final installment in the Violator Hip Hop compilations) in 2001. He continued to make regular appearances on various mixtapes and compilations  eventually dropping the “Hitman for hire” mixtape hosted by Hot 97's DJ Kay Slay which received some praise in XXL magazine and was given MTV mixtape of the month on MTV news. In 2021 he released the full length lp entitled “Hitman for hire V2” featuring Wu-Tang Clan Ghostaface Killah and Raekwon as well as Conway The Machine. JoJo Pellegrino has appeared as well on Rockstar Games well known successful game Grand Theft Auto III.

Discography and Features 
DJ Skribble traffic jams album (compilation)
Release date: 1999 
Track 19: Badah Bing Badah boom by Jojo Pellegrino

VIOLATOR V2.0 (compilation)
Release date: July 24, 2001
Label Sony/Loud/Violator
JOJO PELLEGRINO features on track 1: “Intro”

Track 8: “Fiend”

Track 14: Grind season ft. Corrupt of the dog pound

Track 16: “Next generation” Ft. Fabolous, Red Cafe, Remy Ma, Cadillac Tah

Hitman for hire (Jojo Pellegrino mixtape hosted by Kay Slay)
Release date: March 2003
Label PellaVision/Grain

PellaFreestyles Vol 1
Release date: July 2007
Label PellaVision

Hitman for hire V2 (Jojo Pellegrino album)
Release date: May 21, 2021
Label: PellaVision

Track List:

1.Spiked Bat

2.Let me kno

3.Threat (feat. RJ Payne and Dave Goode)

4.Flojo

5.3 Kings (feat. Ghostface Killah & Raekwon)

6.It's working (feat. Fryday Knyte)

7.Shootaz (feat. Conway the Machine)

8.One Shot (feat. Carlton Fisk)

9.Fly (Fly Italians Live Abundantly)

10.1a (feat. Shyheim)

11.Rocket Launcha (feat. Carlton Fisk & DAINJA MENTAL)

12.Nightmares (feat. Ot the Real & Mowe)

13.Bada Fu$King Bing (feat. Gorilla Nems)

14.Long Winter (feat. Dave Goode)

References

External links

Wu-Tang Clan affiliates
Italian hip hop musicians
Italian rappers
American people of Italian descent